is a Japanese light novel series written by Ichiei Ishibumi and illustrated by Miyama-Zero. The story centers on Issei Hyodo, a perverted high school student from Kuoh Academy who desires to be a harem king and is killed by his first date, revealed to be a fallen angel, but is later revived as a devil by the red haired devil princess Rias Gremory to serve her and her devil family. Issei's deepening relationship with Rias proves dangerous to the angels, the fallen angels, and the devils. High School DxD began serialization in Fujimi Shobo's Dragon Magazine in its September 2008 issue. The first volume was released on September 20, 2008. A total of twenty five volumes is available in Japan as of March 2018 under their Fujimi Fantasia Bunko imprint. A manga adaptation by Hiroji Mishima began serialization in the July 2010 issue of Dragon Magazine and later in the March 2011 issue of Monthly Dragon Age with eleven volumes released.

An anime adaptation by TNK aired on TV Tokyo's satellite channel AT-X and other networks from January 6 to March 23, 2012. The anime is licensed in North America by Crunchyroll, in the United Kingdom by Manga Entertainment, and in Australia by Madman Entertainment. A second season called  aired from July 7 to September 22, 2013. A third season called  aired from April 4 to June 20, 2015. A fourth season called  aired from April 10 to July 3, 2018.

Synopsis

Plot

 is a former all-girls school that has recently turned co-ed, but it has a secret. Unknown to normal humans,  and  comprise part of the student population. One of these students, Issei Hyodo, is a lecherous second-year human student who lives a peaceful life. After an ordinary school day, Issei is suddenly asked out on a date by a girl named Yuma Amano. After their date, Yuuma brings Issei to a local park and makes a startling request that she wants him to die for her. She reveals herself as Raynare, a fallen angel, and she tries to kill him. Using her summoning card, Rias Gremory, a buxom third-year student at Kuoh Academy, revives him. Issei wakes up the next morning, thinking that the events that occurred were all just a dream. Immediately after being attacked by another fallen angel and waking up, he notices Rias naked in his room. Rias reveals to Issei her true identity as a devil and says that as a result of his death at the hands of Yuuma, she has reincarnated him as a devil, making him her faithful servant in the process.

Story arcs
Ishibumi has grouped the light novels into story arcs. The first arc, titled , ran through the first two volumes.  is the second story arc and follows volumes three through six.  follows volumes seven through twelve. The fourth arc, follows volumes fourteen through twenty-one. The fifth and final arc of the series, starts at volume twenty-two and ends at volume twenty-five. The author has announced a sequel to the series, which began on July 20, 2018.

The light novels also feature a series of side stories set in between the main storyline and are often compiled into volumes. So far, three short story collections (Volume 8, Volume 13 and Volume 15) have been published.

Production
Ishibumi had previously worked on a horror genre series two years prior to the publishing of the first light novel for High School DxD. In the volume 1 afterword, he mentions that he changed his writing style, and wanted to develop one in the school-life, love-comedy, battle, and fantasy genre. His main character Issei was made into a lecherous guy at the request of his editor. For the first volume, he made Rias a second lead character and heroine, and Asia to be the second heroine. Some of his characters are loosely referenced from the Bible, non-fiction books, and mythology. He created a world where the war between the three main factions (Angels, Devils, and Fallen Angels) is over, and where many famous angels and devils have already ceased to exist. He also added characters and legendary beasts from a variety of places from Norse mythology to Japanese Youkai. The concept of Balance Breaker was to represent a super-powered version of the character's Boosted Gear, and he likens this to the Super Saiyan in Dragon Ball and the Bankai in Bleach.

Ishibumi intended to make the shounen-style light novel series that teenagers would be embarrassed to buy, yet was concerned that it might get an age restriction. In each of his afterword sections in the light novels, he makes numerous references to Oppai (breasts) and notes when he tries to make his characters more erotic.

Media

Light novels

High School DxD began as a light novel series written by Ichiei Ishibumi, with illustrations provided by Miyama-Zero. High School DxD was published from September 20, 2008 to March 20, 2018 across 25 volumes. A bonus story, called , was released with the July 2012 issue of Dragon Magazine (released on May 19, 2012) as a bunkobon volume. The story takes place after Volume 12, and centers on Ophis' first shopping trip in the human world.

After the release of Volume 25, Ishibumi announced a sequel, . Continuing from where DxD left off, the first volume of the series was released on July 20, 2018.

Manga

A manga adaptation illustrated by Hiroji Mishima began serialization in the July 2010 issue of Dragon Magazine, and later in Monthly Dragon Age in its March 2011 issue. It ended on February 9, 2018. The first volume was published by Fujimi Shobo on June 9, 2011, with a total of eleven volumes published under their Dragon Comics Age imprint. A spinoff manga, called , illustrated by Hiroichi, was serialized in Monthly Dragon Age from the October 2011 issue (Released on September 9, 2011) to the April 2012 issue (Released on March 9, 2012). Serving as a side story, the manga takes place after chapter 10 of the main manga, and centers on Asia Argento's first duties as a Devil. It was later released as a tankōbon volume on March 9, 2012. Yen Press had licensed the spin-off for an English release and released the volume on December 16, 2014. A second spin-off series, titled , was published between April and August 2013 issues of Monthly Dragon Age and was collected into one volume. Illustrated by SODA, it adapted the short stories found in the light novels.

Anime

An anime adaptation produced by TNK and directed by Tetsuya Yanagisawa aired on TV Tokyo's satellite channel AT-X between January 6 and March 23, 2012. AT-X airings of the series are uncensored, while the airings on TV Kanagawa (which began on January 11, 2012) and other networks are heavily censored. Six DVD and Blu-ray compilation volumes were released by Media Factory between March 21 and August 29, 2012, each containing an OVA short entitled . An OVA episode that is listed as episode 13 was bundled with the limited edition of the 13th light novel on September 6, 2012 on Blu-ray. The script for the episode was handled by Ichiei Ishibumi, who is the author of the light novels. Another OVA episode of the first season that is listed as episode 14 is written by Ishibumi and was bundled with the limited edition release of the 15th light novel on May 31, 2013 on Blu-ray.

A second season of High School DxD, titled , was announced at the post-end credits of the 13th episode, and premiered on AT-X and Chiba TV on July 7, 2013. As with the first season, AT-X airings are uncensored, while airings on all other channels are heavily censored.

In June 2014, Fujimi Shobo announced plans to produce a third anime season. It was announced on December 6, 2014 that the third season is titled High School DxD BorN, and aired from April to June 2015, with the same staff and voice cast. The series loosely adapts volumes five through seven of the light novels for the first 9 episodes, with the last two and a half episodes comprising a completely original story; the second half of the season finale incorporates elements from both Volume 6 and Volume 7.

At the 2016 Fantasia Bunko Daikanshasai, Fujimi Shobo announced that a new anime series was in production. In October 2017, it was announced that the fourth season is titled  and it aired from April to July 2018. The season was produced by Passione, replacing TNK. Following the premiere of the fourth season, there has been no official statement regarding the production or release of a fifth season of Highschool DxD.

In North America, all four seasons are licensed by Funimation for simulcast on their video website before releasing the series on DVD and Blu-ray and in Australia by Madman Entertainment. Manga Entertainment have licensed the series in the UK for a DVD and Blu-ray release in 2014. Funimation released the first season of High School DxD on DVD and Blu-ray on August 20, 2013. Funimation released the second season of High School DxD titled High School DXD New on DVD and Blu-ray on November 11, 2014. Funimation released the third season of High School DxD titled High School DXD BorN on DVD and Blu-ray on September 6, 2016. Funimation has also licensed High School DxD Hero and streamed it with a simuldub on May 1, 2018.  The series has also been simulcast by Crunchyroll. Following Sony's acquisition of Crunchyroll, the series was moved to Crunchyroll.

The series is licensed in Australia by Madman Entertainment, but it was not released in New Zealand after the Office of Film and Literature Classification (OFLC) classified it objectionable it because "it encourages and legitimizes the pursuit of young persons as viable adult sexual partners". The series was reclassified R16 in 2022. High School DxD Hero is licensed by Funimation in Australia and New Zealand, with Madman Entertainment handling distribution.

Music
The music of the High School DxD series was composed by Ryosuke Nakanishi. Eight pieces of theme music are used for the three seasons. The opening theme for the first season is "Trip -Innocent of D-", performed by Larval Stage Planning, while the ending theme song is "STUDYxSTUDY" by the voice actress unit StylipS, consisting of Arisa Noto, Yui Ogura, Kaori Ishihara, and Maho Matsunaga, who all had voice roles in the anime. The songs were released as CD singles on January 25 and February 5, 2012, respectively, under the Lantis label. An original soundtrack was released on March 21, 2012, also under the Lantis label. A character song mini-album, called , featuring the main female cast from the anime series, was released on June 27, 2012 under the Lantis label.

The second season featured an opening and ending theme for the two arcs. The opening theme for the first arc is "Sympathy" by Larval Stage Planning.

For the third season, the opening theme is "Bless Your Name" by ChouCho. The ending theme is "Give Me Secret" by StylipS.

For the fourth season, the opening theme is "Switch" by Minami and the ending theme is "Mote nai Kuse ni(｀;ω;´)" by Tapimiru.

Video games
Kadokawa Games announced in July 2013 that a videogame adaptation of High School DxD was in development for Nintendo 3DS. Originally scheduled to be released in Japan on November 28, 2013, it was delayed in order to "improve the product's quality", and was instead released on December 19, 2013. Described as an "erotic battle adventure", the game features a visual novel and turn-based battle system. A PlayStation Vita game titled High School DxD New Fight was released on August 28, 2014 in Japan.

Other media
An internet radio show, called , aired on HiBiKi Radio Station on December 12, 2011.

A trading card game by Prism Connect featuring characters from the series was released on July 27, 2012 in a starter deck and booster pack.

Reception
According to Oricon, High School DxD was the sixth top-selling light novel series in Japan for 2012, selling a total of 654,224 units. Also, in 2013 High School DxD sold over 346,173 copies according to Oricon. The English version of the first manga volume reached No. 2 in the New York Times best-seller list. As of March 20, 2018, the first 25 volumes had 4 million copies in print.

The anime adaptation of High School DxD received mixed reviews, with critics praising the visuals, musical score, and sometimes the fanservice. The plot left critics divided. Sequential Tart, in a review of the anime, praised the animation quality, voice acting, and fanservice scenes, as well as the depth of the "actually really engaging" plot. Finding the animation "to die for" and the music "fun throughout", Active Anime lauded DxD as "a kick ass action comedy that's crazy sexy", with "sexy devil ladies, a hero with heart, and exhilarating action mak[ing] this a win-win!" Stig Høgset of THEM Anime Reviews agreed on DxD being "a whole lot of fun", praising the characters, fanservice, and visuals. Writing that "High School DxD turned out to be a really pleasant surprise", Høgset continued that "I will certainly look into the sequel if FUNimation ever gets it out the door on disc."

Anime News Network's Theron Martin in his official series review of High School DxD, praised the color, musical, fanservice and character developments, but criticized the lack of freshness of the show, concluding that "Evaluated as a general release series, High School DxD has enough going for it to be a little better than average. Evaluate it as a fan service-focused series, though, and it is one of the top recent titles of its type."

Notes

References

External links
Japanese
  at Fujimi Shobo
 
  at AT-X

English
  at Yen Press
  at Funimation
 
 

2008 Japanese novels
2010 manga
2012 anime OVAs
2012 anime television series debuts
2013 anime television series debuts
2013 video games
2014 video games
2015 anime television series debuts
2018 anime television series debuts
AT-X (TV network) original programming
Anime and manga based on light novels
Anime and manga controversies
Classical mythology in anime and manga
Comedy anime and manga
Demons in anime and manga
Harem anime and manga
Fujimi Fantasia Bunko
Fujimi Shobo manga
Funimation
Harem video games
 
Japanese comedy novels
Kadokawa Dwango franchises
Light novels
Nintendo 3DS games
Norse mythology in anime and manga
Passione (company)
PlayStation Vita games
School life in anime and manga
Shōnen manga
Supernatural anime and manga
TNK (company)
Television series about angels
Television series about demons
Television shows based on light novels
Video games developed in Japan
Works banned in China
Yen Press titles